Christian Stauffer House is a historic home located at East Lampeter Township, Lancaster County, Pennsylvania. It was built in 1769, and is a two-story, four bay limestone dwelling, in a melded Pennsylvania-German and Anglo-American Georgian style.  It has a two-story, two bay frame addition on a stone foundation built in the 1890s.  Also on the property are a contributing late-18th century bank barn, stone and frame summer kitchen, and late-19th century carriage house.

It was listed on the National Register of Historic Places in 1986.

References

Houses on the National Register of Historic Places in Pennsylvania
Houses completed in 1769
Houses in Lancaster County, Pennsylvania
National Register of Historic Places in Lancaster County, Pennsylvania